Twiste may refer to:

 Twiste (Diemel), a river of Hesse and of North Rhine-Westphalia, Germany
 Twiste (Oste), a river of Lower Saxony, Germany